"Blue Sky Mine" is a song by Australian rock band Midnight Oil, released in February 1990 as the first single from their seventh studio album, Blue Sky Mining (1990). The song was inspired by the experiences of workers at the Wittenoom asbestos mines who contracted various asbestos-related diseases. The "blue" refers to blue asbestos, and the "sugar refining company" mentioned in the lyrics refers to the Colonial Sugar Refining Company Ltd, the owner of the mines.

"Blue Sky Mine" peaked at  7 on the Canadian RPM Top Singles chart, No. 8 on the Australian Singles Chart, No. 47 on the US Billboard Hot 100, and No. 1 on both the Billboard Album Rock and Modern Rock charts. It charted the highest in New Zealand, where it reached No. 2 for two weeks in March 1990. In January 2018, as part of Triple M's "Ozzest 100", the 'most Australian' songs of all time, "Blue Sky Mine" was ranked number 39.

The Claudia Castle directed music video won the ARIA Award for Best Video at the ARIA Music Awards of 1991.

Track listings

Charts and certifications

Weekly charts

Year-end charts

Certifications

See also
 List of Billboard Mainstream Rock number-one songs of the 1990s
 List of Billboard number-one alternative singles of the 1990s

References

1990 singles
1990 songs
ARIA Award-winning songs
Columbia Records singles
Environmental songs
Midnight Oil songs
Political songs
Songs written by Bones Hillman
Songs written by Jim Moginie
Songs written by Martin Rotsey
Songs written by Peter Garrett
Songs written by Rob Hirst
Songs about mining